The Union County Courthouse is the county courthouse for Union County, New Jersey located in the county seat of Elizabeth. It is a contributing property to the Mid-Town Historic District. The courthouse building with 17-story tower was designed by the architect Oakley and Son and completed in 1931. The courthouse complex includes a 3-story portion, a 7-story annex building, built in 1927 a 5-story annex building, built in 1964 and an 8-story courtroom building, built in 1932. As of May, 2015, peregrine falcons had been nesting on the courthouse.

Earlier building
An earlier courthouse building was designed by the architects Ackerman and Ross. In May 1905, according to one newspaper, "The work of engraving two tablets at the marble entrance to the new courthouse is in progress. The tablet on the right will read 'Union County Courthouse Commenced February 1903; Completed April 1905...Architects, Ackerman & Ross..."

See also
County courthouses in New Jersey
National Register of Historic Places listings in Union County, New Jersey
List of United States federal courthouses in New Jersey
List of tallest buildings in New Jersey

References 

Courthouses on the National Register of Historic Places in New Jersey
Buildings and structures in Elizabeth, New Jersey
Government buildings completed in 1931
County courthouses in New Jersey
Union County, New Jersey
Beaux-Arts architecture in New Jersey
Tourist attractions in Union County, New Jersey
National Register of Historic Places in Union County, New Jersey
New Jersey Register of Historic Places
Neoclassical architecture in New Jersey